Sanel Kuljić (born 10 October 1977) is an Austrian former professional footballer who played as a striker.

Club career
Born in Salzburg, Kuljić started his professional career in Salzburg but made his name at Austrian Football First League side SV Pasching with whom he won promotion to the Austrian Football Bundesliga in 2002. He repeated that feat with SV Ried in 2005, when he also became 2nd division top goalscorer. In 2006, he became league top goalscorer and subsequently moved abroad to join Swiss side FC Sion but controversially returned to Austria after one year when he signed for Vienna club Austria Wien.

Kuljić left FK Austria Wien for newly formed Austrian second-division side FC Magna Wiener Neustadt – who acquired the playing licence of SC Schwanenstadt for the 2008–09 campaign – and was joined by Austria Wien team-mates Yüksel Sariyar and Sašo Fornezzi.

On 25 November, Kuljić scored four goals and his team Wiener Neustadt beat LASK Linz 4–1.

International career
Kuljić is of Bosnian descent; his father emigrated to Austria from SR Bosnia and Herzegovina in the 1970s. made his debut for the Austria national team in an August 2005 friendly match against Scotland and has earned 20 caps, scoring three goals. He became a regular in the national team squad but was surprisingly overlooked for EURO 2008.

Extortion
In November 2013, Kuljić was taken in custody after former Kapfenberger teammate Dominique Taboga claimed he was blackmailed by Kuljić to manipulate match results. After being accused of trying to manipulate 18 matches in the first two Austrian tiers, Kuljić was sentenced to five years in prison in autumn 2014. He was released early in March 2017 for good conduct.

Drug dealing
In September 2019 Kuljić was arrested for drug dealing. In December he was handed a one-year prison sentence with Kuljić stating that he had only been involved with drug dealing because of a cocaine addiction he was suffering from.

Honours
 Austrian Bundesliga: 1997
 Austrian Bundesliga top goalscorer: 2006

References

External links
 Player profile – FC Magna Wiener Neustadt
 Profile – Austria Archiv
 

1977 births
Living people
People from Hallein
Austrian people of Bosnia and Herzegovina descent
Association football forwards
Austrian footballers
Austria international footballers
Austrian expatriate footballers
Expatriate footballers in Switzerland
FC Red Bull Salzburg players
LASK players
SV Ried players
FC Sion players
FK Austria Wien players
Kapfenberger SV players
Austrian Football Bundesliga players
Swiss Super League players
Expatriate footballers in Greece
Match fixers
Sportspeople banned for life
Footballers from Salzburg (state)
Austrian expatriate sportspeople in Switzerland
Austrian expatriate sportspeople in Greece